A Journey Through Time was a 2002 concert tour by Elton John.

This is the eleventh tour of Australia by Elton John. The tour completely sold out.

Tour dates

Setlist

Funeral for a Friend/Love Lies Bleeding 
Bennie and the Jets 
Someone Saved My Life Tonight 
The Ballad of the Boy in the Red Shoes 
Philadelphia Freedom 
The Wasteland 
Rocket Man 
I Guess That's Why They Call It the Blues 
Daniel 
I Want Love 
This Train Don't Stop There Anymore 
Take Me to the Pilot 
Sacrifice 
Blue Eyes 
Sorry Seems to Be the Hardest Word 
Oh My Sweet Carolina 
Mona Lisas and Mad Hatters 
Holiday Inn 
Tiny Dancer 
Levon 
Original Sin 
I'm Still Standing 
Crocodile Rock 
Pinball Wizard 
Don't Let the Sun Go Down on Me 
Your Song

Tour band
 
Elton John – piano, vocals
Nigel Olsson – drums, backing vocals
John Mahon – percussion, backing vocals
Davey Johnstone – guitars, mandolin, backing vocals
Bob Birch – bass, backing vocals
Guy Babylon – keyboards

References

External links

 Information Site with Tour Dates

Elton John concert tours
2002 concert tours